Rastislav Bakala (born 22 April 1990 in Čadca) is a Slovak football midfielder who currently plays for ŠK SFM Senec.

SK Dynamo České Budějovice
In winter 2008, he joined Czech club SK Dynamo České Budějovice. He made his debut for SK Dynamo České Budějovice against FC Baník Ostrava on 17 May 2009.

References

External links

at skcb.cz
at fotbal.idnes.cz

1990 births
Living people
People from Čadca
Sportspeople from the Žilina Region
Slovak footballers
Association football midfielders
FK Inter Bratislava players
SK Dynamo České Budějovice players
MFK Dolný Kubín players
ŠK Senec players
Czech First League players
Expatriate footballers in the Czech Republic